Mudcrutch 2 (or simply 2) is the second and final studio album by American rock band Mudcrutch, released on May 20, 2016 and was the last recorded studio material by Tom Petty before his death in 2017.

Promotion
A limited edition 7" vinyl single of "Trailer" backed with "Beautiful World" was released for Record Store Day 2016. The band embarked on its first American tour following the release of the album in May and June 2016.

Accolades

Track listing

The song "Trailer"
"Trailer" was originally recorded by Tom Petty and the Heartbreakers and released in 1985 as the B-side of the single "Don't Come Around Here No More" and again in 1995 on the Petty box set Playback. It was re-recorded with an added third verse for this album and released as the lead single.

Personnel
Mudcrutch

Mike Campbell – guitar, lead vocal on "Victim of Circumstance"
Tom Leadon – guitar, lead guitar on "Victim of Circumstance", lead vocal on "The Other Side of the Mountain", backing vocals on "Dreams of Flying", "Beautiful Blue", "Save Your Water", "Victim of Circumstance"
Randall Marsh – drums, lead vocal on "Beautiful World"
Tom Petty – bass guitar, harmonica on "Trailer", lead vocals, co-lead vocal on "The Other Side of the Mountain", backing vocals on "Beautiful World", "Welcome to Hell", "Victim of Circumstance"
Benmont Tench – organ, piano, Mellotron, lead vocal on "Welcome to Hell", backing vocals on "Save Your Water", "Victim of Circumstance"

Additional musicians

Sebastian Harris – shaker on "Victim of Circumstance"
Josh Jove – pedal steel guitar on "Beautiful Blue"
Herb Pedersen – banjo on "The Other Side of the Mountain", harmony vocal on "The Other Side of the Mountain", "Hungry No More"

Production

Mike Campbell – producer
Greg Looper – engineer
Tom Petty – producer
Ryan Ulyate – producer, recording, mixing

Charts

Weekly charts

Year-end charts

References

2016 albums
Mudcrutch albums
Albums produced by Tom Petty
Reprise Records albums